The 2008 Donington Park Superbike World Championship round was the eleventh round of the 2008 Superbike World Championship. It took place on the weekend of 5–7 September 2008, at the Donington Park circuit.

Superbike race 1 classification

Superbike race 2 classification

Supersport race classification

Notes
Race 1 in Superbike was stopped after 9 laps, for danger caused by oil on the already slippery track. It was later restarted, but it was stopped again after 10 laps for rain. The total laps completed were 19 and thus full points were awarded.
The result of race 1 is determined by the aggregate of the two heats. Riders who had an accident or retired in the laps in which the red flag was exposed were not classified.

Donington Park Round
Donington